Kavalan Avan Kovalan is a 1987 Indian Tamil-language film, directed by  Visu, starring  Prabhu, Rekha and Madhuri. It was released on 29 May 1987.

Plot 

The hero, unknown to himself, has a look-alike. The look alike is good for nothing and is in love with his cross-cousin. The hero, a film director, is married to an devout, pious, orthodox wife who never lets him near her on account of her religious resolutions. This results in him having an affair and ending up getting blackmailed. The director's father-in-law, understands the situation of both look alikes and uses both to solve the problem of the other.

Cast 

Prabhu
Rekha
Madhuri
Prameela
Kalaranjini
Visu
Oru Viral Krishna Rao
Loose Mohan
Omakuchi Narasimhan
Pyramid Natarajan
M. S. Bhaskar
Gundu Kalyanam
Master Haja Sheriff
Jithan
Sethu Vinayagam
S Narasimhan
Thayir Vadai Desikan
Kanchi Ramesh
Raghuvaran (special appearance)
Karthik

Soundtrack 
Soundtrack was composed by Vijayanand, and the lyrics were written by Vaali.

Reception 
The Indian Express wrote, "It is Prabhu who must be singled out for honours." Jeyamanmadhan of Kalki compared the film unfavourably to Visu's earlier films.

References

External links 
 

1980s Tamil-language films
1987 films
Films directed by Visu
Films with screenplays by Visu